Global is the debut album by Brian Dougans, most famous for being part of the British electronica group The Future Sound of London. Unlike FSOL's ambient, breakbeat and trip hop styles, it is composed largely of US style vocal house, including Ben Ofoedu, most famous for his work with duo Phats & Small in the 1990s. Also contained is the breakthrough acid house single, "Stakker Humanoid", and industrial track "Sunshine & Brick", featuring FSOL's Gaz Cobain on vocals.

Track listing
 "Stakker Humanoid"
 "Tonight"
 "Dream"
 "Technoid"
 "Cry Baby"
 "Sunshine & Brick"
 "The Deep"
 "Slam"
 "Crystals"
 "Don't Stop"

Crew
Written by Brian Dougans
Produced by Brian Dougans & John Laker
Executive Producer Morgan Khan
Mixed by Brian Dougans & John Laker
The Deep mixed by Peter Black
Slam vocals by Lisa Millett
Don't Stop & The Deep rap by Ben Ofoedu
Tonight vocals by Sharon Benson and Janet Coffie
Sunshine & Brick vocals by Gaz Cobain

References

The Future Sound of London albums
1989 debut albums